The Detroit Diesel Series 50 is an inline four-cylinder diesel engine, that was introduced in 1993 by Detroit Diesel. The Series 50 was developed from the existing block of its sister engine, the Series 60, which itself was initially designed by Detroit Diesel.  The cylinder heads were cast by John Deere at one time.

History
The Series 50 engine is used as a major bus engine in North America, especially from buses built in the mid to late 1990s and early 2000s. The power plant was offered for several applications: trucks, buses, motor homes, construction and industrial equipment, and military vehicles. It is unusual to find an inline four-cylinder engine propelling heavy duty buses, which traditionally use inline six, V-6 or V-8 diesel engines.

In 2000, in order to better respond to more stringent EPA emissions standards, Detroit Diesel announced revisions of the Series 50 for diesel applications. The changes included the addition of an exhaust gas recirculation (EGR) system, and a variable geometry turbocharger system to improve torque.  

In September 2004, Detroit Diesel ceased production of the Series 50 heavy duty diesel engine for on highway applications due to emissions standards.  It is still available for off-road applications. A replacement was scheduled to take place in 2007, then was pushed back until 2009. According to Detroit Diesel, Series 50 engines will no longer be produced for non-Daimler AG trucks or buses beginning in 2010.

Alternative fuels
In addition to being powered by diesel fuel, the engine can also use alternative fuels such as compressed natural gas (CNG)  or liquified natural gas (LNG) under the Series 50G label. Several thousand Series 50 propelled buses are now on the streets of major cities such as New York City and Los Angeles.

Design

Features 
 Power ratings ranging from 
 Supports the DDEC III and DDEC IV
 Since 2001 the engines included an EGR device.
 Twin balance shafts
 Single over head camshaft design
 Electronic Unit Injection

Popular horsepower ratings
  @ 1200 rpm, 250 hp govern at 2100 rpm
  @ 1200 rpm, 275 hp govern at 2100 rpm
  @ 1200 rpm, 320 hp govern at 2100 rpm

Competing power plants
 Caterpillar 3208
 Caterpillar C9
 Cummins 6CTA / Westport 8.3-L
 Cummins L10 / ISL
 Cummins M11 / ISM
 Detroit Diesel 6V92
 International DT466
 Perkins 1104C 4.4-L

References

 
 

50
John Deere
Straight-four engines
Diesel engines by model